Magda Holm (November 14, 1898 – October 6, 1982) was a Swedish stage actress. She also appeared in eight films during the silent and early sound era.

Selected filmography
 The Counts at Svansta (1924)
 A Maid Among Maids (1924)
 Where the Lighthouse Flashes (1924)
 40 Skipper Street (1925)
 The Girl in Tails (1926)
 Charley's Aunt (1926)
 Syv dage for Elisabeth (1927)
 Mother-in-Law's Coming (1932)

References

Bibliography
 Gustafsson, Tommy. Masculinity in the Golden Age of Swedish Cinema: A Cultural Analysis of 1920s Films. McFarland, 2014.

External links

1898 births
1982 deaths
Swedish film actresses
Swedish stage actresses
20th-century Swedish actresses